Thyreus ceylonicus is a species of bee belonging to the family Apidae in subfamily Apinae. The subspecies are:

 T. c. andamanensis (Meyer, 1921)
 T. c. angulifer (Cockerell, 1919)
 T. c. dives Lieftinck, 1962
 T. c. lampides Lieftinck, 1962
 T. c. lilacinus (Cockerell, 1919)
 T. c. locuples Lieftinck, 1962
 T. c. nereis Lieftinck, 1962

References

External links
 http://animaldiversity.org/accounts/Tetralonia_ceylonicus/classification/
 https://www.academia.edu/7390502/AN_UPDATED_CHECKLIST_OF_BEES_OF_SRI_LANKA_WITH_NEW_RECORDS
 https://www.itis.gov/servlet/SingleRpt/SingleRpt?search_topic=TSN&search_value=766428

Apinae
Hymenoptera of Asia
Insects of Sri Lanka
Insects described in 1905